Mesomermis is a genus of nematodes belonging to the family Mermithidae.

Species:
 Mesomermis acutata Rubzov, 1973 
 Mesomermis acuticauda Artyukhovskii & Kharchenko, 1971

References

Mermithidae